The 2017 World Para Alpine Skiing Championships was an international disability sport alpine skiing event held in Tarvisio, Italy from 22 to 31 January 2017. The Championship is held biannually by the International Paralympic Committee (IPC). This was the first time the championship was held under the name World Para Alpine Skiing Championships.

Events

Men

Women

Medal table
Germany topped the medal tally with 14 medals. Hosts Italy finished 10th with 3 medals.

Participating nations
30 nations participated.

References

World Para Alpine Skiing Championships
January 2017 sports events in Italy
Alpine skiing competitions in Italy